Lee John Worgan (born 1 December 1983) is a footballer who plays as a goalkeeper for Eastbourne Borough.

Club career

Early career
Worgan began his career by coming through the youth ranks at Wimbledon and was one of a few players to stay with the squad during the move to become Milton Keynes Dons. However, he never managed to establish himself there and spent two weeks on loan at Wycombe Wanderers during the 2003–04 season when they suffered a goalkeeper injury crisis with Steve Williams, Frank Talia, and Tom Gott all out injured.

In August 2004 he joined Rushden & Diamonds on a free transfer but again failed to establish himself and at the end of the year he was released and was signed by Cardiff City on another free transfer. He did not make a league appearance for Cardiff but did play in the FAW Premier Cup on one occasion. He was released by Cardiff at the end of the 2005–06 season after having spent some of the season on loan at Merthyr Tydfil.

Since then he has played for Eastbourne Borough and in October 2006 he signed for Isthmian League Premier Division side Hastings United, making his debut in a 2–1 win over Croydon Athletic in the FA Trophy. In his first year, after helping the side to promotion, he was unanimously voted the Supporters' Club player of the year and was quickly offered a one-year extension to his contract.

Tonbridge Angels
In May 2008 he signed for Tonbridge Angels. He received a red card on his competitive debut for Tonbridge against Wealdstone.

In March 2011, he won the 'Sells Goalkeeping Academy Good Hands' award for the best defensive record in the Isthmian League Premier Division that month, conceding three goals in six games.

Worgan was named Tonbridge Angels player of the year for the 2010/11 season, with performances against Bury Town and Wealdstone particularly impressing fans.

At the end of the 2012–13 season, Worgan was named in the Conference South team of the year with performances against Dover, Salisbury and Hayes and Yeading particularly impressing managers and fans alike but after five years at Tonbridge, more than 200 appearances in all competitions and one promotion, Worgan announced that he was leaving the club.

Maidstone United
On 15 May 2013, Worgan joined Isthmian League Premier Division side Maidstone United. The stopper cited the size of the club and its infrastructure as his reasons for the move. He swept up the club's player of the season awards in his debut season, receiving the accolade from supporters, teammates, and the manager.

He was a pivotal part of the side that won promotion to the National League South in 2014-15 and made his 100th consecutive league appearance for the club on 5 September 2015 in the 0 - 0 draw away at Gosport Borough. Following the departure of Steve Watt, Worgan was made club captain at the Gallagher Stadium.

Worgan was once again a vital cog in the Stones machine that won an unlikely promotion to the National League at the climax of the 2015–16 season, with the goalkeeper going down in club folklore for his promotion-winning penalty save from Danny Kedwell in the playoff final against Ebbsfleet United. The promotion meant the club had gone up three times in 4 years, and it was Worgan's second consecutive promotion with the club.

During the 2016–17 season, Worgan's first ever in the top tier of non league football, he made his 150th consecutive league appearance for the Maidstone against Gateshead in October 2016.

Dover Athletic
On 29 October 2018, Worgan joined Kent rivals Dover Athletic on a -year deal that would also see him take up a coaching role. He made his debut for the club in a 2–2 home draw with Havant and Waterlooville in the FA Trophy first round. 

On 12 August 2020, Worgan has his contract terminated by mutual consent in order to focus on a full-time career in teaching.

Chelmsford City
On 13 August 2020, Worgan stepped down a division, signing for Chelmsford City. Following the culmination of the  2020–21 National League South season, Worgan departed Chelmsford.

Dorking Wanderers
In May 2021, Worgan joined National League South side Dorking Wanderers. After making just 5 appearances for the Wanderers, Dorking mutually agreed to terminate Worgan's contract for personal reasons.

Eastbourne Borough
On 9th September 2021, Worgan returned to Eastbourne Borough. He made his long awaited debut for Eastbourne in a National League South match against Hemel Hempstead, having never made an appearance in his first spell with the club.

International career
Worgan has played for Wales through most youth levels and was a regular in the Wales U21 team for several years.

Career statistics

References

External links

1983 births
Living people
Sportspeople from Eastbourne
Footballers from East Sussex
English footballers
Welsh footballers
Wales youth international footballers
Wales under-21 international footballers
Association football goalkeepers
Wimbledon F.C. players
Wycombe Wanderers F.C. players
Rushden & Diamonds F.C. players
Cardiff City F.C. players
Merthyr Tydfil F.C. players
Eastbourne Borough F.C. players
Hastings United F.C. players
Tonbridge Angels F.C. players
Maidstone United F.C. players
Dover Athletic F.C. players
Chelmsford City F.C. players
Dorking Wanderers F.C. players
English Football League players
National League (English football) players
Association football goalkeeping coaches